The 1991–92 Ohio Bobcats men's basketball team represented Ohio University in the college basketball season of 1991–92. The team was coached by Larry Hunter and played their home games at the Convocation Center. They finished the season 18–10 and finished fourth in the MAC regular season with a conference record of 10–6.

Roster

Schedule

|-
!colspan=9 style=|Non-conference regular season

|-
!colspan=12 style=| MAC regular season

|-
!colspan=9 style=| MAC Tournament

Source:

Statistics

Team Statistics
Final 1991–92 Statistics

Source

Player statistics

Source

References

General
Final 1992 Division I Men's Basketball Statistics Report
Ohio Record Book

Ohio Bobcats men's basketball seasons
Ohio
Bob
Bob